The Miniver Story is a 1950 American drama film that is the sequel to the 1942 film Mrs. Miniver. Like its predecessor, the picture, made by MGM, stars Greer Garson and Walter Pidgeon, but it was filmed on-location in England. The film was directed by H.C. Potter and produced by Sidney Franklin, from a screenplay by George Froeschel and Ronald Millar based on characters created by Jan Struther. The music score was by Miklós Rózsa and Herbert Stothart, with additional uncredited music by Daniele Amfitheatrof, and the cinematography by Joseph Ruttenberg.

Garson, Pidgeon, Reginald Owen, and Henry Wilcoxon return in their original roles. Also in the cast were Peter Finch (as a Polish officer) and James Fox (as Toby Miniver, in his first film appearance).

Plot

The story, told partly in flashback and narrated by Clem Miniver, commences on VE Day as Clem and Judy return home from war service and Toby returns from a foster family in the United States.

Judy, a corporal driver, is loved by Tom Foley, a captain in the Royal Engineers, but she is besotted with a general (Leo Genn) married but separated and twice her age. Kay Miniver has also conducted a brief, platonic affair with an American colonel.

Clem is now restless and dissatisfied; he successfully applies for a design contract in Brazil. But Kay, unknown to him, has developed a major cardiac condition and has one year at most to live. Despite this, she persuades the general to return to his wife, leaving Judy free to marry Tom.

The wedding goes ahead. Clem decides to stay in London and brings Tom into his architectural practice, and soon after he's made aware of his wife's illness. Satisfied that her family are safe and happy, Kay dies.

No mention is made of the eldest Miniver son Vincent who appeared in the earlier film, possibly because Greer Garson and Richard Ney (the actor who portrayed Vincent) had married and been divorced (1943–1947) by the time The Miniver Story was produced in 1950.

Cast
 Greer Garson as Kay Miniver
 Walter Pidgeon as Clem Miniver
 John Hodiak as Spike Romway
 Leo Genn as Steve Brunswick
 Cathy O'Donnell as Judy Miniver
 Reginald Owen as Mr. Foley
 Anthony Bushell as Dr. Kaneslaey
 Richard Gale as Tom Foley
 Peter Finch as Polish officer
 James Fox as Toby Miniver, billed as William Fox

Production
Cinematographer Joseph Ruttenberg was almost let go due to British film union regulations, but was kept on after lead actress Greer Garson threatened to quit the production.

Reception
According to MGM records the film earned only $990,000 in the US and Canada but performed better elsewhere, making $1.23 million. However this was not enough to recover the large budget of over $3 million, and the film recorded a loss of $2.3 million, making it MGM's most costly flop of 1950.

References

External links
 
 
 
 

1950 films
1950 drama films
American black-and-white films
American drama films
American sequel films
1950s English-language films
Films scored by Miklós Rózsa
Films directed by H. C. Potter
Films set in England
Films shot at MGM-British Studios
Metro-Goldwyn-Mayer films
1950s American films